The Ilona Massey Show is a DuMont Television Network variety show hosted by actress Ilona Massey and featuring musician Irving Fields. Massey sang on a set built to resemble a nightclub. The show aired Mondays from November 1, 1954, to January 3, 1955 for a total of 10 episodes.

Episode status
As with many DuMont series, no episodes are known to exist.

See also
List of programs broadcast by the DuMont Television Network
List of surviving DuMont Television Network broadcasts
1954-55 United States network television schedule

References

Bibliography
David Weinstein, The Forgotten Network: DuMont and the Birth of American Television (Philadelphia: Temple University Press, 2004) 
Alex McNeil, Total Television, Fourth edition (New York: Penguin Books, 1980) 
Tim Brooks and Earle Marsh, The Complete Directory to Prime Time Network TV Shows, Third edition (New York: Ballantine Books, 1964)

External links
The Ilona Massey Show at IMDB
DuMont historical website

DuMont Television Network original programming
1954 American television series debuts
1955 American television series endings
Black-and-white American television shows
Lost television shows